Gespe'gewa'gi: The Last Land is a Canadian television documentary series, which premiered on APTN in 2021. The series profiles a group of Mi'kmaq fishermen from the Listuguj Miꞌgmaq First Nation in Quebec, centering both on their lifestyles and on the larger societal issue of traditional indigenous fishing rights.

The series was created and directed by Ernest Webb for Rezolution Pictures, and premiered on February 13, 2021. It received two separate weekly broadcasts, one in English and one in Mi'kmaq.

In August 2021 it was announced that the series had been renewed for a second season, which will further expand to profile other Mi'kmaq communities in Quebec, New Brunswick and Nova Scotia.

References

2021 Canadian television series debuts
2020s Canadian documentary television series
Aboriginal Peoples Television Network original programming
Mi'kmaq in popular culture
First Nations television series